Glorious is the thirteenth album by the German heavy metal band Bonfire. It was released in 2015 by Borlia Records. This is the first album by what is deemed to be the third incarnation of the band, after the group had broken up earlier in the year and was resurrected by Hans Ziller by renaming his temporary music project, EZ Livin', to Bonfire. The album features a Beatles cover song as well as two remade songs from Bonfire’s most successful album, Fireworks.

Track listing

Band members
David Reece - lead vocals
Hans Ziller - guitars
Frank Pane - guitars
Ronnie Parkes - bass
Harry Reischmann - drums

References
 Melodic Rock review

Bonfire (band) albums
2015 albums